The 2010 New Mexico gubernatorial election took place on November 2, 2010. Democratic Governor Bill Richardson was term limited and could not seek re-election to a third consecutive term.

On June 1, 2010, the Republicans nominated Susana Martínez, the district attorney for Doña Ana County, New Mexico, and the Democrats nominated Lieutenant Governor Diane Denish.

While it was initially thought that Richardson would resign early to become Secretary of Commerce in the Obama administration, Richardson withdrew from the position due to allegations of corruption that were later cleared and he remained governor until the conclusion of his term.

Susana Martínez won the election on November 2, 2010, and became New Mexico's first elected female governor, as well as the first Latina governor of any state.

Democratic nomination
The Democratic primary election was held on June 1, 2010.

Candidate
Diane Denish, lieutenant governor

Results

Republican nomination
The Republican primary was held on June 1, 2010. Susana Martinez won the Republican nomination by getting over 50 percent of the vote in the primary. A pre-primary convention was held on March 13 and Martinez received 47 percent of the pre-primary Republican vote.

Candidates

Declared
 Janice Arnold-Jones, state representative
 Pete Domenici, Jr., attorney and son of former U.S. Senator Pete Domenici
Susana Martínez, Doña Ana County district attorney
 Doug Turner, public relations firm owner and political consultant
 Allen Weh, former chairman of the Republican Party of New Mexico

Declined
 Steve Pearce, former U.S. representative and nominee for the U.S. Senate in 2008 (ran for Congress)
 Heather Wilson, former U.S. representative and candidate for the U.S. Senate in 2008
 Gregory Zanetti, former Bernalillo County Republican Party chair and New Mexico National Guard brigadier general

Convention
A pre-primary nominating convention was held on March 13, 2010. Susana Martinez was victorious, winning the support of 46.65 percent of delegates, while Allen Weh received 26.32%, Janice Arnold-Jones received 13.16%, Doug Turner won 9.43%, and Pete Domenici, Jr. won 4.61%. Candidates who receive less than 20% of the convention vote are required to collect twice as many signatures as those who received 20% in order to appear on the primary ballot. Nonetheless, Arnold-Jones, Turner and Domenici all signaled their intention to remain in the race.

Polling

Results

General election

Predictions

Polling

With Arnold-Jones

With Domenici, Jr.

With Turner

With Weh

Results

See also
Governorship of Susana Martínez
2010 United States gubernatorial elections

References

External links
New Mexico Secretary of State – Elections 
New Mexico Governor Candidates at Project Vote Smart
Campaign contributions for 2010 New Mexico Governor from Follow the Money
New Mexico Governor 2010 from OurCampaigns.com
2010 New Mexico Governor General Election: Susana Martinez (R) vs Diane Denish (D) graph of multiple polls from Pollster.com
Election 2010: New Mexico Governor from Rasmussen Reports
2010 New Mexico Governor - Martinez vs. Denish from Real Clear Politics
2010 New Mexico Governor's Race from CQ Politics
Race Profile in The New York Times
Official campaign websites (Archived)
 Diane Denish
 Susana Martínez
 Janice Arnold-Jones
 Peter Domenici, Jr.
 Doug Turner
 Allen Weh

Gubernatorial
2010
New Mexico